The Ripon Obelisk is an obelisk monument in the centre of the Yorkshire settlement of Ripon in Northern England. It was designed by Nicholas Hawksmoor and constructed in 1702 with the support of John Aislabie, Ripon's Member of Parliament. It has been granted Grade I status and was first listed in 1949. It is located in the market square of Ripon, one of the smallest settlements in England to have city status. It stands at around eighty feet in height.

Hawksmoor may have been inspired by recent discoveries that Ripon might have originally been a Roman town. In his 1724 book A Tour Through the Whole Island of Great Britain Daniel Defoe notes "In the middle of it stands a curious column of stone, imitating the obelisks of the ancients, though not so high, but rather like the pillar in the middle of Covent Garden, or that in Lincoln's Inn".

In 1781 the monument was restored by William Aislabie, the son of the obelisk's founder and himself a long-standing MP to celebrate his sixty years in Parliament. At this point a weathervane was added in the style of the Ripon hornblower. A plaque was added soon afterwards, which misleadingly implies that William was the builder of the monument.

References

Bibliography
 Eyres, Patrick. Sculpture and the Garden. Routledge, 2017.
 Hinks, John. The English Urban Renaissance Revisited. Cambridge Scholars Publishing, 2018.
 Ridgway, Christopher; Williams, Robert. Sir John Vanbrugh and Landscape Architecture in Baroque England, 1690–1730. Sutton, 2000.
 Taylor, Maurice; Stride, Alan. Ripon Through Time. Amberley Publishing, 2011. 

Ripon
Monuments and memorials in North Yorkshire
Obelisks in England
Grade I listed buildings in North Yorkshire
Nicholas Hawksmoor buildings